Malaysia competed in the 1998 Asian Games in Bangkok, Thailand from 6 to 20 December 1998. Malaysia ended the games at 29 overall medals. Its chef-de-mission was Zakaria Ahmad.

Medal summary

Medals by sport

Multiple medalists
Malaysian competitors that have won at least two medals.

Medallists

Athletics

Men
Track events

Field event

Women
Track and road events

Badminton

Men's team
Quarterfinal

Semifinal

Ranked 3rd in final standings

Women's team
Quarterfinal

Bowling

Women

Boxing

Cue sports

Men

Cycling

Road

Equestrian

Dressage

Jumping

Eventing

Field hockey

Men's tournament

Gymnastics

Rhythmic
Women

Karate

Men
Kumite

Women
Kata

Kumite

Sailing

Men

Open

Squash

Individual

Swimming

Men

Wushu

Men

References

Nations at the 1998 Asian Games
1998
Asian Games